TMT may refer to:

Science and engineering
 Tandem mass tag, a chemical label
 Temporal motivation theory, in psychology
 Terror management theory, in psychology
 Thermo-mechanical treatment, a metallurgical process
 Thirty Meter Telescope, astronomical telescope
 Trimethylthiazoline, a component of fox urine
 Trimethyltrienolone, an antiandrogen

Software
 Texas Multicore Technologies, licensee of SequenceL programming language

Transport
 Today Makes Tomorrow, a Taiwanese shipping company
 Thane Municipal Transport, a bus operator in India
 Toyota Motor Thailand
 Tubular Modular Track for railways
 Porto Trombetas Airport, Pará, Brazil, IATA code

Entertainment
 The Moscow Times, a newspaper
 Tiny Mix Tapes, a music web site

Other uses
 Türk Mukavemet Teşkilatı ("Turkish Resistance Organisation"), Cyprus, 1958-1974
 Turkmenistani manat, ISO 4217 currency code 
 Top Management Team, senior management in a business
 Technology, Media and Telecommunications, industry sector for investment banking